Dunlop Standard Aerospace Group Ltd. was formed in 1998 from the assets of BTR Aerospace Group when they were purchased by Doughty Hanson & Co.

In 2004 the company was sold and split into two.  The Carlyle Group, a private equity firm, acquired the Standard Aero division, now known as StandardAero.  StandardAero is an aviation maintenance, repair and overhaul company headquartered in Tempe, Arizona.

Meggitt plc acquired the Dunlop Aerospace Design and Manufacturing division.

See also 
Aerospace industry in the United Kingdom

References

External links
StandardAero company website
Dunlop Aerospace website

Aerospace companies of the United Kingdom
Former defence companies of the United Kingdom
Manufacturing companies of Canada
Aerospace companies of Canada
Manufacturing companies established in 1998
Manufacturing companies disestablished in 2004
British companies established in 1998